Carole-Marie Allard (born September 6, 1949) is a former Canadian politician who served as a Liberal member of Canada's House of Commons. She represented the riding of Laval East from 2000 to 2004. She was Parliamentary Secretary to the Minister of Canadian Heritage, and a member of the Standing Committee on Justice and Human Rights and the Vice-Chair of the Special Committee on Non-medical use of drugs. She lost the 2004 election to Robert Carrier of the Bloc Québécois in the riding of Alfred-Pellan.

She is a lawyer, former press attaché, former designer, organizer and presenter of media management training programs, a former spokesperson for a corporation, and she is a former journalist, writer and producer.

She is the stepmother of  Mélanie Joly who is a member of the House of Commons of Canada representing Ahuntsic-Cartierville and also serves as the Minister of Foreign Affairs in the government of Justin Trudeau.

Partial electoral record

Books

External links
 
 

1949 births
Living people
Members of the House of Commons of Canada from Quebec
Liberal Party of Canada MPs
Women members of the House of Commons of Canada
Women in Quebec politics
People from Dolbeau-Mistassini
21st-century Canadian politicians
21st-century Canadian women politicians